Denys Wortman (May 2, 1887 – September 20, 1958) was a painter, cartoonist and comic strip creator. From 1924 to 1954 he drew the comic strip Metropolitan Movies (originated by Gene Carr in 1921), which ran in the New York World and was syndicated nationwide by the World Feature Service and later United Feature Syndicate.

His work was the subject of an exhibition at the Museum of the City of New York in 2011.

References

1887 births
1958 deaths
20th-century American painters
20th-century American male artists
American male painters
American cartoonists